Sasan (Kharosthi: 𐨯𐨯 , ; 45-50 CE) was an Indo-Scythian king, and the nephew of Aspavarma, whom he succeeded. As indicated by coins hoards and overstrikes, Sasan is thought to have been a contemporary of Kujula Kadphises and Mujatria.

He ruled in the Bajaur area of modern Pakistan, and is considered one of the Apraca rulers. He is essentially known through his coins.

References

Indo-Scythian kings
1st-century monarchs in Asia
History of Pakistan
1st-century Iranian people